Cyril Gautier (born 26 September 1987) is a French road bicycle racer, who competed as a professional from 2007 to 2022. He was named in the start list for the 2015 Vuelta a España.

Major results

2004
 4th Overall Giro della Lunigiana
 10th Road race, UCI Junior Road World Championships
2006
 7th Overall Grand Prix Guillaume Tell
2007
 3rd Grand Prix de Rennes
 4th Overall Grand Prix du Portugal
1st Young rider classification
 8th Tour du Finistère
2008
 1st  Road race, UEC European Under-23 Road Championships
 1st Stage 2 Kreiz Breizh Elites
 2nd Grand Prix de Plumelec-Morbihan
 6th Road race, UCI Under-23 Road World Championships
 6th Grand Prix d'Isbergues
 7th Trophée des Grimpeurs
2009
 6th Grand Prix de Plumelec-Morbihan
 7th Overall Tour du Limousin
 9th Overall Circuit de Lorraine
2010
 1st Route Adélie
 3rd Les Boucles du Sud Ardèche
2011
 3rd Les Boucles du Sud Ardèche
 5th Boucles de l'Aulne
 6th Overall Étoile de Bessèges
 6th Grand Prix d'Ouverture La Marseillaise
2012
 1st  Young rider classification Critérium International
2013
 1st Tour du Finistère
 5th Overall Étoile de Bessèges
2014
 4th Overall Tour du Limousin
1st Stage 2
 4th GP Ouest–France
 6th Overall Paris–Nice
 6th Classic Sud-Ardèche
 7th Overall Tour du Haut Var
  Combativity award Stage 16 Tour de France
2015
 4th La Drôme Classic
 6th Overall Étoile de Bessèges
2016
 1st Paris–Camembert
 1st  Mountains classification La Méditerranéenne
2017
 Volta a la Comunitat Valenciana
1st  Sprints classification
1st  Mountains classification
 1st Stage 3 Tour du Limousin
 2nd Route Adélie
 5th Trofeo Laigueglia
2019
 1st  Mountains classification Tour du Haut Var
 9th Trofeo Matteotti
2020
 9th Malaysian International Classic Race
2021
 8th Royal Bernard Drôme Classic

Grand Tour general classification results timeline

References

External links

 Profile on team website
 
 

French male cyclists
Sportspeople from Côtes-d'Armor
1987 births
Living people
Cyclists from Brittany